In mathematics, especially in the area of algebraic topology known as stable homotopy theory, the Adams filtration and the Adams–Novikov filtration allow a stable homotopy group to be understood as built from layers, the nth layer containing just those maps which require at most n auxiliary spaces in order to be a composition of homologically trivial maps.  These filtrations, named after Frank Adams and Sergei Novikov, are of particular interest because the Adams (–Novikov) spectral sequence converges to them.

Definition
The group of stable homotopy classes  between two spectra X and Y can be given a filtration by saying that a map  has filtration n if it can be written as a composite of maps 
 
such that each individual map  induces the zero map in some fixed homology theory E. If E is ordinary mod-p homology, this filtration is called the Adams filtration, otherwise the Adams–Novikov filtration.

Homotopy theory